Kosea Odongo (b. 12 January 1971) is an Anglican bishop who serves in Uganda: he was Bishop of Soroti since 2019. to 12 July 2018.

Odongo was born in Amuria District.  He was educated at Uganda Christian University. He worked in the Soroti diocese before being appointed Chaplain to Stanley Ntagali, the Archbishop of Uganda.

References

21st-century Anglican bishops in Uganda
Anglican bishops of Soroti
1971 births
People from Amuria District
Uganda Christian University alumni
Living people